

Great Britain
Bermuda – William Popple, Governor of Bermuda (1755–1763)

Portugal
 Angola – António Álvares da Cunha, Governor of Angola (1753–1758)
 Macau – Francisco Antonio Pereira Coutinho, Governor of Macau (1755–1758)

Spain
 New Spain – Agustín de Ahumada, Viceroy of New Spain (1755–1760)

Colonial governors
Colonial governors
1756